The R428 road, also called the Athy Road, is a regional road in Ireland, located in County Kildare and County Laois.

References

Regional roads in the Republic of Ireland
Roads in County Kildare
Roads in County Laois